Kampung Mundai (Mundai Village) is one of the Bidayuh community settlement in Padawan area of Sarawak, Malaysia. It is located at Km 2, Jalan Padawan near a small town of Tapah, about 38 km from Kuching city centre. There are about 250 houses in the village.

History
The name of Mundai is originally used after Plaman Munoi. In the past, there was a small group of Bidayuh Bisapug community settlement besides the Tapah River. They were farmers and built a hut besides the river. Once upon a time, there was a great traditional longhouse of Bidayuh Bisapug community on the top of Brungu Hill. In the past, around 1900, this community went down and explore new settlements. The earliest of these resulted in a new longhouse at the foot of Brungu Hill named Sarig (now Kampung Sarig). They also explored to the south, along Pluman River, where the Bisapug community built a new longhouse, Pluman (now called Kampung Simpok), a place where Pluman River meets the Serin River. Then, some of this community explored to the east through Tapah River and made a new settlement called Kampung Plaman Sidaun. Some of them explored even further to the place called Plaman Munoi. More and more people came and formed the new village called Kampung Mundai. Exactly, the words 'Mundai' may refer to Bidayuh Bisapug's words, Mun and Ndai which mean Going Down and Make or Build. In combination these two words may mean  Going down and build a new village.

Ethnics 
Most of its population are the Bidayuhs (95%), and the others are Chinese, Iban and other ethnics.

Religion 
Almost all of Mundai residents are Christians. They were divided into two: the Anglicans and the Roman Catholics. There were two churches in the village. The Anglicans attend Christianity faith at the St. Matthew's Church, while the Roman Catholics go to the St. Bonaventure's Church. The former Anglican Chapel was built around 1967, and rebuilt a new church in 1991, while the Catholic Church was built in 1982.

Education
In earlier times, a group of Anglican missionaries built St Matthew's Anglican School in the village to offer formal education and teach  Christianity. When Sarawak joined the Federation of Malaysia in 1963, the national educational system took over schooling in Sarawak and the Anglican missionary school b e came known as SRB St Matthew (today as SK St Mattew). In secondary education, most study at SMK Tun Abdul Razak, formerly known as Dragon School then Kolej Tun Abdul Razak.

Language

The Bidayuh community living in this village speaks Bisapug (a sub-dialect of Bidayuh or Land Dayak). Other villages speaking the same dialect are Kampung Simpok(Pluman), Kampung Sarig and Kampung Pesa.

Kuching District